NPU may mean:

Science and technology 
 Natural Product Updates, a journal in chemistry
 Net protein utilization, the ratio of amino acid mass converted to proteins to the mass of amino acids supplied
 NPU terminology, a medical terminology for the clinical laboratory sciences.

Computing
 Network Processing Unit, for packet processing of network packets
 Neural Processing Unit, for artificial intelligence processing
 Numeric (floating point) Processing Unit

Organisations 
 Na Píobairí Uilleann, a non-profit organization dedicated to the promotion of the Irish Uilleann pipes and its music.
 Neighborhood Planning Units in Atlanta, Georgia, USA
 Nineveh Plain Protection Units, an Assyrian regional militia in Iraq
 National Police of Ukraine, government agency
 National Power Unity, nationalist political party in Latvia.

Universities
 National Penghu University of Science and Technology, Penghu, Taiwan
 Nilamber Pitamber University, Medininagar, Jharkhand, India.
 Northwestern Polytechnical University, Xi'an, Shaanxi, China
 Northwestern Polytechnic University, Fremont, California, USA
 North Park University, Chicago, Illinois, USA

See also